Erika Vogelsang (born 1 March 1995) is a Dutch former tennis player.

She has a career-high singles ranking by the Women's Tennis Association (WTA) of 709, achieved on 21 November 2016. She also has a career-high WTA doubles ranking of 307, achieved on 2 July 2018.

Vogelsang made her WTA Tour main-draw debut at the 2017 Ricoh Open, in the doubles draw, partnering Kelly Versteeg.

ITF finals

Doubles (8–8)

External links
 
 

1995 births
Living people
Dutch female tennis players